Timothy Shanahan (born December 22, 1960) is an American philosopher and Professor of Philosophy at Loyola Marymount University. He is known for his research on philosophy of science, philosophy and film, and the morality of terrorism.

Books
 Reason and Insight: Western and Eastern Perspectives on the Pursuit of Moral Wisdom, 2nd edition (Belmont, CA: Wadsworth, 2003).
 The Evolution of Darwinism: Selection, Adaptation, and Progress in Evolutionary Biology (New York: Cambridge University Press, 2004).
 Philosophy 9/11: Thinking about the War on Terrorism (Chicago: Open Court, 2005).
 The Provisional Irish Republican Army and the Morality of Terrorism (Edinburgh: Edinburgh University Press, 2009).
 Philosophy and Blade Runner (Houndmills: Palgrave Macmillan, 2014).
Blade Runner 2049: A Philosophical Exploration (London & New York: Routledge, 2019).

See also
Darwinism
philosophy of biology

References

External links
 Timothy Shanahan at Loyola Marymount University

21st-century American philosophers
Analytic philosophers
Political philosophers
Philosophers of art
Philosophers of science
Philosophy academics
Living people
1960 births
Loyola Marymount University faculty
University of Notre Dame alumni
State University of New York at Cortland alumni